Laurie Kilmartin (born July 16, 1965) is an American comedian and writer best known for being a finalist on Last Comic Standing season 7. Since 2011, she has been working as a staff writer for Conan O'Brien's show Conan.

Early life
Kilmartin was born in 1965 in Santa Clara County, California, and grew up in Walnut Creek, California. Her father was a civil engineer, and worked abroad for much of her childhood, building dams and bridges in Iran, Nicaragua, Saudi Arabia, and the Philippines.

She attended the University of California, Los Angeles, where she was a competitive swimmer.

Career

Stand-up
Kilmartin began performing standup in 1987, doing contract comedy gigs in the Pacific Northwest. She has since performed stand-up on Conan, Jimmy Kimmel Live!, Comedy Central's Premium Blend, Showtime, the USO Tour Cuba, for troops in Iraq, Shorties Watchin' Shorties, Verdict with Dan Abrams, Red Eye w/ Greg Gutfeld, and The World Stands Up. She has been featured at comedy festivals in Aspen, Edinburgh, and Montreal.

She also appeared on VH1's Best Week Ever, the Today Show, White Boyz in Da Hood, Countdown with Keith Olbermann, The Rachel Maddow Show, Fox & Friends and The Oprah Winfrey Show.

In 2009 Kilmartin released a CD, Five Minutes to Myself, consisting of material she was not allowed to use on air. The CD covers topics such as immigrant boyfriends and unwanted Mexican babies, then answers an age-old question: Why is God such a prick in the Old Testament? Punchline Magazine called Five Minutes to Myself one of the “Top Ten Comedy CDs of 2009.”

Her comedy special, 45 Jokes About My Dead Dad, stand up comedy about cancer, hospice, death, grieving and funerals, debuted on Seeso, December 29, 2016.

Kilmartin was also a ‘Top Ten’ finalist in season 7 of NBC’s Last Comic Standing. She was also listed in The Huffington Post'''s 53 Favorite Female Comedians list in 2011.

In early 2016, Kilmartin and fellow comic Jackie Kashian began a new podcast produced by Nerdist Industries called The Jackie and Laurie Show. The two primarily discuss stand-up comedy in LA and on the road, occasionally covering harassment and the unequal treatment of female comics, Kilmartin's job as a staff writer on the late-night circuit, and Kilmartin's multi-generational family living situation.

 Media appearances 
During an MSNBC panel discussion following the May 2022 leak of a Supreme Court draft, which would overturn Roe v. Wade, Kilmartin joked that she "make sweet love" to the person who leaked the brief. She also commented that if the leaker turned out to be a Republican, she would "joyfully abort our fetus and let them know."

Writing
As a writer, Kilmartin was on the staff of The Late Late Show, Tough Crowd with Colin Quinn (on which she was also a frequent panelist), and Comedy Central's Too Late with Adam Carolla and The Bonnie Hunt Show. She also wrote articles published on Huffington Post, Babble.com, and co-authored Sherri Shepherd's memoir, Permission Slips.

In 2012, she wrote the New York Times bestseller Sh*tty Mom: The Parenting Guide for the Rest of Us.

In 2018, she published Dead People S*ck, "an honest, irreverent, laugh-out-loud guide to coping with death and dying."

Personal life
Kilmartin has a son born in 2006. She is a single mother who often jokes about her son and motherhood.

Her mother died from complications of COVID-19 on June 18, 2020.

 Discography 
 Five Minutes to Myself (2009)
 45 Jokes About My Dead Dad (2017)
 Corset'' (2021)

References

External links

 
 
 The Jackie and Laurie Show website

1965 births
Living people
American stand-up comedians
Last Comic Standing contestants
People from Walnut Creek, California
Comedians from California
20th-century American comedians
21st-century American comedians
American women comedians
People from Santa Clara County, California
UCLA Bruins women's swimmers
Writers from California
21st-century American women writers
21st-century American writers
20th-century American women